Trust Territory is a science fiction novel by American writers Chris Morris and Janet Morris, published in 1992. It is the second book of the Threshold trilogy.

References

External links
 http://www.goodreads.com/book/show/3166986-trust-territory

1992 American novels
1992 science fiction novels
Novels by Janet Morris